Sir George Eulas Foster, GCMG, PC, PC (September 3, 1847 – December 30, 1931) was a Canadian politician and academic.

Foster was a Member of Parliament (MP) and a Senator in the Canadian Parliament for a total of 45 years, 5 months and 24 days. He enjoys the unique distinction of having served in the cabinets of seven Canadian Prime Ministers: Macdonald, Abbott, Thompson, Bowell, Tupper, Borden and Meighen.

He coined the phrase "splendid isolation" to praise British foreign policy in the late 19th century.

Two factors thwarted whatever ambitions he may have had to become Prime Minister himself: his legally questionable marriage in Chicago to his newly divorced former landlady, and his later involvement in a trust company scandal.

Background
Born in Carleton County, New Brunswick, Foster received a Bachelor of Arts degree from the University of New Brunswick in 1868.

He taught in various high schools and seminaries until 1870 when he was appointed Professor of Classics and Ancient Literature in the University of New Brunswick. He shortly afterwards studied in Edinburgh, Scotland, and Heidelberg, Germany, resuming his professorship in 1873. He resigned in 1879 and became a noted temperance lecturer.

Politics
Foster entered politics with his election to the House of Commons of Canada in the 1882 federal election as a Conservative MP representing New Brunswick. He joined the Cabinet of Sir John A. Macdonald as Minister of Marine and Fisheries in 1885, and was promoted to Minister of Finance in 1888. Foster retained this position after Macdonald's death and through the successive governments of Prime Ministers Abbott, Thompson, Bowell and Tupper. He led a group of seven cabinet ministers who resigned temporarily in January 1896 to force the retirement of Bowell, who denounced them as a 'nest of traitors'. Foster's debates with Sir Richard Cartwright, the former Liberal Minister of Finance under Prime Minister Mackenzie, are the stuff of Canadian Parliamentary legend.

With the defeat of the Tories in the 1896 election, Foster retained his seat and joined the Opposition. He was a prominent supporter of Canada's involvement in the Anglo-Boer War from 1899 to 1901. He lost his seat in the 1900 election but returned to parliament in 1904, this time representing the riding of Toronto North in Ontario. He remained an Opposition MP until his party returned to government in the 1911 federal election under Sir Robert Borden and he continued in the government under Arthur Meighen.

During his final years in cabinet, Foster served as Minister of Trade and Commerce, and received a knighthood (KCMG) in 1914 for his work in the Royal Commission on Imperial Trade; he was named to the Imperial Privy Council in 1916 and elevated to GCMG in 1918. He served as a Canadian delegate to the 1919 Versailles Peace Conference. He was acting Prime Minister in 1920, when Borden was absent due to ill health. From 1920 to 1921, he was chairman of the Canadian delegation to the first assembly of the League of Nations. In 1921, he was appointed to the Canadian Senate in which he served until his death.

"Splendid isolation"
Foster is known for coining the term "splendid isolation" in January 1896 when praising Britain's foreign policy of isolation from European affairs.

The term was popularized by Lord Goschen, First Lord of the Admiralty, during a speech at Lewes on 26 February 1896: "We have stood here alone in what is called isolation – our splendid isolation, as one of our colonial friends was good enough to call it." The phrase had appeared in a headline in The Times, on 22 January 1896, paraphrasing a comment by Foster to the Parliament of Canada on 16 January 1896: "In these somewhat troublesome days when the great Mother Empire stands splendidly isolated in Europe."

The ultimate origin of "splendid isolation" is suggested in Robert Hamilton's Canadian Quotations and Phrases, which places the Foster quotation beneath a passage from the following paragraph from Cooney's Compendious History of Northern New Brunswick and Gaspé (reprinted in 1896) describing England's situation in 1809–1810 during the Napoleonic Wars:In the midst of this terrific commotion, England stood erect: wrapt up in her own impregnability, the storm could not affect her: and therefore, while others trembled in its blast, she smiled at its fury. Never did the 'Empress Island' appear so magnificently grand; – she stood by herself, and there was a peculiar splendour in the loneliness of her glory.

This, in turn, echoes the stoicism of Marcus Aurelius: "Be like the promontory against which the waves continually break, but it stands firm and tames the fury of the water around it."

Death and family

His first wife was the ex-spouse of Daniel Black Chisholm, a former Liberal-Conservative Ontario MP, and his second wife was a daughter of Sir William Allan, a former British MP for Gateshead.

He died without issue. Foster and his first wife are buried in Ottawa's Beechwood Cemetery, near the grave of Sir Cecil Spring Rice.

Following his death, Foster's widow granted Canadian historian William Stewart Wallace permission to produce an authorized biography of her late husband. Wallace was provided manuscripts, papers, and diary entries handwritten by Foster, including an unfinished autobiography. Wallace's biography of Foster, titled The Memoirs of the Rt. Hon. Sir George Foster, was published in 1933.

Archives 
There is a George Foster fonds at Library and Archives Canada.

Electoral record 

By-election: On election being declared void

By-election: On Mr. Foster's acceptance of the office of Minister of Marine and Fisheries

Notes

External links 

 
 
 The Canadian Parliament; biographical sketches and photo-engravures of the senators and members of the House of Commons of Canada. Being the tenth Parliament, elected November 3, 1904.
 Robert Craig Brown, "FOSTER, SIR GEORGE EULAS" in Dictionary of Canadian Biography, vol. 16, University of Toronto/Université Laval, 2003–    
 Sir George Foster – The Quebec History Encyclopedia
 Library and Archives Canada – image of Lady Adeline Foster and Sir George Eulas Foster
 

1847 births
1931 deaths
Canadian Ministers of Finance
Canadian senators from Ontario
Conservative Party of Canada (1867–1942) MPs
Conservative Party of Canada (1867–1942) senators
Canadian Knights Grand Cross of the Order of St Michael and St George
Members of the House of Commons of Canada from New Brunswick
Members of the House of Commons of Canada from Ontario
Canadian members of the Privy Council of the United Kingdom
Members of the King's Privy Council for Canada
Persons of National Historic Significance (Canada)
University of New Brunswick alumni
Academic staff of the University of New Brunswick
Burials at Beechwood Cemetery (Ottawa)